Jazzercise is a fitness franchise company founded by Judi Sheppard Missett in 1968 and headquartered in Carlsbad, California, United States. The franchise's name is a portmanteau of "jazz" and "exercise".

Jazzercise combines dance aerobics, strength and resistance training with popular music for a full-body workout. The company currently has over 8,300 franchisees worldwide in 32 countries.

Early history

Judi Sheppard Missett created Jazzercise in Evanston, Illinois in 1968 as a student at Northwestern University. She was teaching at a dance studio and noticed her classes had high dropout rates. Realizing students were attending for physical fitness and not for performance, Shepard Missett began to hold "just for fun" classes that began with a jazz warmup. These classes were eventually renamed "Jazzercise".  Jazz dance came relatively late into Missett's life—in 1966, just after she graduated from Northwestern University with a degree in theater and dance. She signed up to study with renowned jazz choreographer Gus Giordano at his Evanston studios.

Growth and franchising
Sheppard Missett's family moved to Carlsbad, California, where she taught classes in local rec centers. Jazzercise quickly took off in San Diego and Sheppard Missett trained new instructors herself. Many of those first instructors were in military families, so as they moved around the country, and the world, new populations were continually introduced to the program. Initially using VHS videos, Sheppard Missett was able to train franchisees from a distance and began to sell franchise rights for Jazzercise studios across the country. In addition to the franchised classes, Sheppard Missett produced recorded Jazzercise programs for home use, starting with an LP entitled Jazzercise in 1981 which was certified gold in 1982. Sheppard Missett produced a second LP in 1982 entitled More Jazzercise and released her first VHS Jazzercise workout called Let's Jazzercise a year later.

Jazzercise in popular media
In A Bit of Fry & Laurie, Jazzercise is claimed to be a portmanteau of the words "jazz" and "circumcise".

In Ron Howard's live-action movie adaptation of How the Grinch Stole Christmas, the Grinch's schedule has an hour booked for Jazzercise.

In the episode of Taxi entitled "Louie Goes Too Far", Andy Kaufman (playing Vic Ferrari) suggests to Christopher Lloyd (playing Jim) that he take up Jazzercise as a way of meeting beautiful women.

On The Golden Girls, Bea Arthur (Dorothy) admits taking up Jazzercise in the episodes "The Stan Who Came to Dinner" and "The Audit".

In Troop Beverly Hills, the lead character, Phyllis Nefler, mentions that she hasn't been to Jazzercise in three weeks, after chasing one of her troop members who suddenly runs off during a troop meeting.

In the Futurama episode "Parasite Lost", the parasitic worms are seen Jazzercising Fry's muscles.

The Flight of the Conchords episode "New Zealand Town" of their second television series features a song called "Fashion is Danger", which is a parody of 1980s music and style, and contains a reference to Jazzercise.

"Jazzercise Instructor" is featured as a job in The Sims 2.

In the third series of The Mighty Boosh, Howard Moon goes to Jazzercise classes.

In the Glee episode "Bad Reputation", a tape is found of Sue Sylvester Jazzercising to Olivia Newton-John's "Physical". In the following season's episode "Sexy", Holly Holliday is shown teaching a Jazzercise class in which Will Schuester participates.

In the ABC hit show The Goldbergs, Beverly Goldberg is frequently portrayed referencing or stepping to Jazzercise.

On the October 9, 2012 episode of The Daily Show, Jon Stewart references Jazzercise in his opening monologue.

In 2018 alone, Jazzercise has been featured in People magazine and Harper's Bazaar.

Featured in fictional Starcourt Mall in season 3 of Stranger Things, where Dustin Henderson and Steve Harrington chase a suspicious looking guy, who turns out to be a Jazzercise instructor.

Mentioned in the song "Party with Your Body" by KC & The Sunshine Band.

Mentioned in Rick & Morty S06E06 when the dinosaurs present a list of things, humanity has accomplished.

References

Further reading

External links
 Jazzercise official website
 Instagram
 Facebook

1980s fads and trends
Companies based in Carlsbad, California
Aerobic exercise
Exercise organizations
Exercise-related trademarks
Franchises